Earl Soham is a small settlement in Suffolk, England.

Earl Soham once belonged to the Earls of Norfolk, the Bigod family (sometimes spelt "Bigot" in old texts), who also owned nearby Framlingham Castle. Edward I granted Roger Bigod permission to hold a market and a lamb and stock fair in the village. The parish was in the hundred of Loes well before 1086. The church dates from about 1320 (chancel) with the nave dated to about 1470 (Kelly's Suffolk Directory 1900) and a perpendicular west tower c. 1475. The Baptist Chapel was built around 1863. The school was first built in 1850. Earl Soham Lodge was originally a hunting lodge, built in the 13th century but rebuilt in 1789. For many years it was the seat of the Cornwallis family. The population of the village peaked in the 19th century with over 750 inhabitants.

Sir Auckland Colvin, colonial administrator in India and Egypt, is buried in the village churchyard.

Governance
An electoral ward in the same name exists. This ward stretches south to Charsfield with a total population taken at the 2011 Census of 2,144.

Notable residents
Thomas Browne, Archdeacon of Ipswich
Nicholas Peke, one of the Ipswich Martyrs
Thomas Steyning, Member of Parliament for Castle Rising in 1559.
Robert Groome, Archdeacon of Suffolk
Auckland Colvin, colonial administrator in India and Egypt
Patricia Highsmith, US Born Crime writer between 1964- 67

References

External links 

Earl Soham Village Website

Villages in Suffolk
Civil parishes in Suffolk